Apollo–Soyuz was the first crewed international space mission, carried out jointly by the United States and the Soviet Union in July 1975. Millions of people around the world watched on television as a United States Apollo spacecraft docked with a Soviet Soyuz capsule. The project, and its handshake in space, was a symbol of détente between the two superpowers during the Cold War.

The unnumbered American vehicle was left over from the canceled Apollo missions, and was the last Apollo module to fly.

The three American astronauts, Thomas P. Stafford, Vance D. Brand, and Deke Slayton, and two Soviet cosmonauts, Alexei Leonov and Valeri Kubasov, performed both joint and separate scientific experiments, including an arranged eclipse of the Sun by the Apollo module to allow instruments on the Soyuz to take photographs of the solar corona. The pre-flight work provided useful engineering experience for later joint American–Russian space flights, such as the Shuttle–Mir program and the International Space Station.

Apollo–Soyuz was the last crewed United States spaceflight for nearly six years until the first launch of the Space Shuttle on 12 April 1981, and the last crewed United States spaceflight in a space capsule until Crew Dragon Demo-2 on 30 May 2020.

Historical background 

The purpose and catalyst of Apollo–Soyuz was the policy of détente between the two Cold War superpowers: the United States and the Soviet Union. Tensions ran high between the two world superpowers while the United States was engaged in the Vietnam War. Meanwhile, the Soviet press was highly critical of the Apollo space missions, printing "the armed intrusion of the United States and Saigon puppets into Laos is a shameless trampling underfoot of international law" over a photograph of the Apollo 14 launch in 1971. Although Soviet leader Nikita Khrushchev made the Soviet Union's policy of détente official in his 1956 doctrine of peaceful coexistence at the 20th Congress of the Communist Party of the Soviet Union, the two nations seemed to be in perpetual conflict.

After John Glenn's 1962 orbital flight, an exchange of letters between President John F. Kennedy and Soviet Premier Nikita Khrushchev led to a series of discussions led by NASA Deputy Administrator Hugh Dryden and Soviet scientist Anatoly Blagonravov. Their 1962 talks led to the Dryden-Blagonravov agreement, which was formalized in October of that year, the same time the two countries were in the midst of the Cuban Missile Crisis. The agreement was formally announced at the United Nations on 5 December 1962. It called for cooperation on the exchange of data from weather satellites, a study of the Earth's magnetic field, and joint tracking of the NASA Echo II balloon satellite. Kennedy could even interest Khrushchev in a joint crewed Moon landing. The assassination of Kennedy on 22 November 1963, and the removal from office of Khrushchev on 14 October 1964, made any personal preferences of the respective leaders moot. Unfortunately, as the competition between the two nation's crewed space programs heated up, efforts to further cooperation at that point came to an end.

Due to tense relations and military implications, space cooperation between the United States and the Soviet Union was unlikely in the early 1970s. On 7 June 1971, the USSR had launched the first piloted orbital space station, Salyut 1. Meanwhile, the United States had launched the Apollo 14 mission several months prior, the third space mission to land humans on the Moon. Each side gave the other little coverage of their achievements.

Both sides had severe criticisms of the other side's engineering. Soviet spacecraft were designed with automation in mind; the Lunokhod 1 and Luna 16 were both uncrewed probes, and each Soyuz spacecraft had been designed to minimize risk due to human error by having fewer manual controls with which human operators would have to contend during flight. By contrast, the Apollo spacecraft was designed to be operated by humans and required highly trained astronauts in order to operate. The Soviet Union criticized the Apollo spacecraft as being "extremely complex and dangerous".

The Americans also had their own concerns about Soviet spacecraft. Christopher C. Kraft, director of the Johnson Space Center, criticized the design of the Soyuz: "We in NASA rely on redundant components — if an instrument fails during flight, our crews switch to another in an attempt to continue the mission. Each Soyuz component, however, is designed for a specific function; if one fails, the cosmonauts land as soon as possible. The Apollo vehicle also relied on astronaut piloting to a much greater extent than did the Soyuz machine." The American astronauts had a very low opinion for the Soyuz space craft as it was a craft that was designed to be controlled from the ground. This was in stark contrast with the  Apollo module that was meant to be flown from the capsule. Eventually Glynn Lunney, the Manager of the Apollo–Soyuz Test Program, warned them about talking to the press about their dissatisfaction as they had offended the Soviets. NASA was worried that any slight would cause the Soviets to pull out and the mission to be scrapped.

American and Soviet engineers settled their differences for a possible docking of American and Soviet spacecraft in meetings between June and December 1971 in Houston and Moscow, including Bill Creasy's design of the Androgynous Peripheral Attach System (APAS) between the two ships that would allow either to be active or passive during docking.

With the close of the Vietnam War, relations between the United States and the USSR began to improve, as did the prognosis for a potential cooperative space mission. Apollo–Soyuz was made possible by the thaw in these relations, and the project itself endeavoured to amplify and solidify the improving relations between the United States and the Soviet Union. According to Soviet leader Leonid Brezhnev, "The Soviet and American spacemen will go up into outer space for the first major joint scientific experiment in the history of mankind. They know that from outer space our planet looks even more beautiful. It is big enough for us to live peacefully on it, but it is too small to be threatened by nuclear war". Thus, both sides recognized ASTP as a political act of peace.

In October 1970, Soviet Academy of Sciences president Mstislav Keldysh responded to NASA Administrator Thomas O. Paine's letter proposing a cooperative space mission, and there was subsequently a meeting to discuss technical details. At a meeting in January 1971, U.S. President Richard Nixon's Foreign Policy Adviser Henry Kissinger enthusiastically espoused plans for the mission, and expressed these views to NASA administrator George Low: "As long as you stick to space, do anything you want to do. You are free to commit—in fact, I want you to tell your counterparts in Moscow that the President has sent you on this mission". By April 1972, both the United States and the USSR signed an Agreement Concerning Cooperation in the Exploration and Use of Outer Space for Peaceful Purposes, committing both the USSR and the United States to the launch of the Apollo–Soyuz Test Project in 1975.

ASTP was particularly significant for the USSR's policy of keeping the details of their space program secret from the Soviet people and the world at large, especially Americans. The ASTP was the first Soviet space mission to be televised in a live fashion during the launch, while in space, and during the landing. Soyuz 19 was also the first Soviet spacecraft to which a foreign flight crew had access before flight; the Apollo crew were permitted to inspect it and the launch and crew training site, which was an unprecedented sharing of information with Americans about any Soviet space program.

Not all reactions to ASTP were positive. Many Americans feared  that ASTP was giving the USSR too much credit in their space program, putting them on equal footing with the sophisticated space exploration efforts of NASA. More feared that the apparent peaceful cooperation between the USSR and the United States would lull people into believing there was no conflict at all between the two superpowers. Some Soviet publicists called American critics of the mission "demagogues who stand against scientific cooperation with the USSR". In general, tensions between the United States and the USSR had softened, and the project set a precedent for future cooperative projects in space.

Apollo crew

Backup crew

Crew notes 
It was American astronaut Deke Slayton's only space flight. He was chosen as one of the original Mercury Seven astronauts in April 1959, but had been grounded until 1972 for medical reasons.

Jack Swigert had originally been assigned as the command module pilot for the ASTP prime crew, but he was removed before the official announcement as punishment for his involvement in the Apollo 15 postal covers incident.

Support crew
Karol J. Bobko, Robert Crippen, Robert F. Overmyer, Richard H. Truly

Flight directors
Pete Frank (Orange team), Neil Hutchinson (Silver team), Don Puddy (Crimson team), Frank Littleton (Amber team)

Soyuz crew 

It was the last space mission for Soviet cosmonaut Alexei Leonov, who had become the first person to walk in space during the March 1965 Voskhod 2 mission.

Backup crew

Mission summary

Background 

The ASTP entailed the docking of an American Apollo command and service module (CSM) with a Soviet Soyuz 7K-TM spacecraft. Although the Soyuz was given a mission designation number (Soyuz 19) as part of the ongoing Soyuz programme, its radio call sign was simply "Soyuz" for the duration of the joint mission. The Apollo mission was not a numbered mission of the Apollo program, and similarly bore the call sign "Apollo". Despite this, the press and NASA have referred to the mission as "Apollo 18", but this should not be confused with the canceled lunar mission.

The Apollo spacecraft was launched with a docking module specially designed to enable the two spacecraft to dock with each other, used only once for this mission. The Saturn IB launch vehicle and CSM were surplus material. Like the Apollo Lunar Module, the docking module had to be retrieved from the S-IVB upper-stage of the Saturn IB rocket after launch. The docking module was designed as both an airlock — as the Apollo was pressurized at about  using pure oxygen, while the Soyuz used a nitrogen/oxygen atmosphere at sea level pressure (about ) — and an adapter, since the surplus Apollo hardware used for the ASTP mission was not equipped with the APAS docking collar jointly developed by NASA and the Academy of Sciences of the Soviet Union for the mission. One end of the docking module was attached to the Apollo using the same "probe-and-drogue" docking mechanism used on the Lunar Module and the Skylab space station, while its other end had the APAS docking collar, which Soyuz 19 carried in place of the standard Soyuz/Salyut system of the time. The APAS collar fitted onto Soyuz 19 was releasable, allowing the two spacecraft to separate in case of malfunction.

The Apollo flew with a three-man crew on board: Tom Stafford, Vance Brand, and Deke Slayton. Stafford had already flown into space three times, including within eight nautical miles of the lunar surface as Commander of Apollo 10, and was the first general officer to fly into space. He was a brigadier general in the United States Air Force at the time of the flight; he would retire with three stars in 1979. Slayton was one of the original Mercury Seven astronauts selected in 1959, but an irregular heartbeat grounded him until 1972. He became head of NASA's astronaut office and, after a lengthy medical program, selected himself for this mission. At the time, Slayton was the oldest person to fly in space and the one with the longest gap between selection as an astronaut and first flight into space. Brand, meanwhile, had trained with the Apollo spacecraft during his time as a backup Apollo 15 command module pilot, and had served two stints as a backup Skylab commander. The closest he had come to flying prior to ASTP was as commander for the Skylab Rescue mission mustered to potentially retrieve the crew of Skylab 3 due to a fuel leak on that mission's Apollo CSM.

The Soyuz flew with two men: Alexei Leonov and Valeri Kubasov. Leonov became the first man to walk in space on Voskhod 2 in March 1965. Kubasov, who flew on Soyuz 6 in 1969, ran some of the earliest space manufacturing experiments. Both were to have flown on the ill-fated Soyuz 11 in 1971 (Leonov as commander, Kubasov as the flight engineer), but were grounded because Kubasov was suspected of having tuberculosis. The two-man crew on the Soyuz was a result of the modifications needed to allow the cosmonauts to wear the Sokol space suit during launch, docking, and reentry.

The ASTP-class Soyuz 7K-TM spacecraft used was a variation of the post-Soyuz 11 two-man design, with the batteries replaced by solar panels enabling "solo" flights (missions not docking to one of the Salyut space stations). Six ASTP-class Soyuz spacecraft were built in total, including the one used. Before the actual mission, two craft were launched uncrewed as Kosmos satellites. The third was launched as the crewed Soyuz 16 flight as a rehearsal in order to test the APAS docking mechanism. Another craft was used fully fueled as a "hot backup" at the launch site – later it was disassembled. And the sixth craft was available as a "cold" backup; it was later used on the last "solo" Soyuz flight in 1976, but with the APAS docking adapter replaced by the MKF-6 multispectral camera.

Launch and mission 
The Soyuz and Apollo flights launched within seven-and-a-half hours of each other on 15 July 1975, and docked on 17 July 1975. Three hours later, the two mission commanders, Stafford and Leonov, exchanged the first international handshake in space through the open hatch of the Soyuz. NASA had calculated that the historic handshake would have taken place over the British seaside resort of Bognor Regis, but a delay resulted in its occurrence being over the city of Metz in France. During the first crew exchange, the crews were read a statement from Soviet Premier Leonid Brezhnev, and received a phone call from U.S. President Gerald Ford.

While the two ships were docked, the three Americans and two Soviets conducted joint scientific experiments, exchanged flags and gifts (including tree seeds which were later planted in the two countries), listened to each other's music (examples include "Tenderness" by Maya Kristalinskaya and "Why Can't We Be Friends?" by War), signed certificates, visited each other's ships, ate together, and conversed in each other's languages. (Because of Stafford's pronounced drawl when speaking Russian, Leonov later joked that there were three languages spoken on the mission: Russian, English, and "Oklahomski".) There were also docking and redocking maneuvers, during which the two spacecraft reversed roles and the Soyuz became the "active" ship.

American scientists developed four of the experiments performed during the mission. Embryologist Jane Oppenheimer analyzed the effects of weightlessness on fish eggs at various stages of development.

After 44 hours together, the two ships separated, and maneuvered to use the Apollo to create an artificial solar eclipse to allow the crew of the Soyuz to take photographs of the solar corona. Another brief docking was made before the ships went their separate ways. The Soviets remained in space for two more days, and the Americans for five, during which the Apollo crew also conducted Earth observation experiments.

Re-entry and aftermath 
The mission was considered a great success, both technically and as a public-relations exercise for both nations. The only serious problem was during reentry and splashdown of the Apollo craft, during which the crew were accidentally exposed to toxic hydrazine and nitrogen tetroxide fumes, caused by unignited reaction control system (RCS) hypergolic propellants venting from the spacecraft and reentering a cabin air intake. The RCS was inadvertently left on during descent, and the toxic fumes were sucked into the spacecraft as it drew in outside air. Brand briefly lost consciousness, while Stafford retrieved emergency oxygen masks, put one on Brand, and gave one to Slayton. The three astronauts were hospitalized for two weeks in Honolulu, Hawaii. Brand took responsibility for the mishap; because of high noise levels in the cabin during reentry, he believes he was unable to hear Stafford call off one item of the reentry checklist, the closure of two switches which would have automatically shut off the RCS and begun drogue parachute deployment. These procedures were manually performed later than usual, allowing the ingestion of the propellant fumes through the ventilation system.

The ASTP was the final flight of an Apollo spacecraft. Immediately after the launch of the Apollo spacecraft, preparations began to convert LC-39B and the Vehicle Assembly Building at Kennedy Space Center for use by the Space Shuttle, the United States' next crewed spacecraft program. LC-39A had already been closed after the launch of Skylab.

Legacy

Technical 

A derivative (but mechanically incompatible) docking collar, APAS-89, was launched as part of the Kristall module of the Soviet Mir space station. Originally intended as the docking port for the (defunct) Buran Soviet space shuttle, the APAS-89 unit was used for the next Russian-American docking mission, STS-71, twenty years later as part of the Shuttle–Mir program (though not before the docking port was tested by the last APAS-equipped Soyuz, Soyuz TM-16, in 1993).

The American Space Shuttle continued to use the same APAS-89 docking hardware through the end of the Space Shuttle program to dock to Mir and then the International Space Station, the latter through the Pressurized Mating Adapters (PMAs).

The PMAs are equipped with the later APAS-95 adapters, which differ from the APAS-89 adapters in that they are no longer androgynous; while compatible with the APAS-89 docking collars, they are not capable of acting as the "active" partner in docking.

The first PMA, PMA-1, remains in use as the interface connecting the Russian-built, NASA-owned Zarya module to the US segment of the ISS (USOS), and so the APAS continues in use to this day (2021).

Political 
Apollo–Soyuz was the first joint US–Soviet space mission. At the time it was thought that space would become either more international or competitive as a result, but it became both. The mission became symbolic of each country's goals of scientific cooperation, while their news reports downplayed the technical prowess of the other. Soviet press implied that it was leading the United States in space flight, tying it to the Marxist–Leninist ideology, while the United States reported that the Soyuz was technically primitive. High-profile space cooperation declined after the successful mission and became entangled in linkage politics, but it set a precedent of cooperation that continued in the Shuttle–Mir Program.

Cultural 
The American and Soviet commanders, Stafford and Leonov, became lasting friends. Leonov was the godfather of Stafford's younger children. Stafford gave a eulogy at Leonov's funeral in October 2019.

An asteroid, 2228 Soyuz-Apollo, discovered in 1977 by Soviet astronomer Nikolai Chernykh, is named after the mission.

To commemorate Apollo–Soyuz, renowned British/Irish bartender Joe Gilmore of The Savoy Hotel's, American Bar created the 'Link-Up' cocktail. When the astronauts were told the cocktail was being flown out from London to be enjoyed on their return, they said, "Tell Joe we want it up here".

Spacecraft locations 

The Apollo Command Module from the mission is on display at the California Science Center in Los Angeles. The descent module of Soyuz 19 is on display at the RKK Energiya museum in Korolyov, Moscow Oblast, Russia.

A display at the National Air and Space Museum in Washington, D.C. shows the docked Apollo/Soyuz configuration. The display is made up of Apollo Command and Service Module 105 (used for vibration testing for the Skylab program), the back-up Docking Module, and a model of the Soyuz spacecraft. An identical Soyuz model is exhibited at the Kennedy Space Center Visitor Complex. A full-size mockup of the two docked spacecraft is at the Cosmosphere in Hutchinson, Kansas.

Commemorations 
The United States Postal Service issued the Apollo–Soyuz commemorative stamps, honoring the United States–Soviet link up in space, on 15 July 1975, the day of the launch.

The remaining crew's most recent reunion was on 16 July 2010, when Leonov, Kubasov, Stafford, and Brand met at an Omega timepiece store in New York City. All except Leonov participated in a public roundtable that evening. Omega had produced several watches to be used on the mission.

Monument 

A large Soyuz–Apollo monument was constructed outside TsUP (the Soviet, later Russian space control center) in Moscow. It consisted of a metal scale model of Earth overarched by an arc terminating in the joined Soyuz–Apollo spacecraft. It was damaged when a vehicle collided with it in the late 1990s, and was removed for repairs.

Mission Control Center
The mission control room that hosted the Americans in Korolyov, Russia, was preserved as a memorial to the Soyuz–Apollo mission.

Program cost 

The United States spent US$245 million ($ today) on Apollo–Soyuz.

See also 

 Interkosmos, a Soviet space program from 1967 to 1994, designed to give foreign nations access to space missions.

References

External links 

 ASTP Chronology
 Apollo-Soyuz Test Project Overview
 ASTP NASA site archived
 Apollo–Soyuz
 The Partnership: A History of the Apollo–Soyuz Test Project – official NASA history of the mission
 International rendezvous and docking mission (Apollo–Soyuz/Salyut) 1971 – NASA report (PDF)
 Apollo/Soyuz test project operational data book. Volume 2: ASTP mass properties data book – NASA report (PDF)
  Apollo–Soyuz test project operation handbook command service docking modules systems operating procedures – NASA flight operations manual (PDF)
 NASA History Series Publications (many of which are on-line)
  «Apollo–Soyuz» – tell Soviet scientists, engineers and astronauts – participants of the joint work of American specialists, Politizdat 1976, with a circulation of 100,000 copies.
 Apollo Soyuz Collection, The University of Alabama in Huntsville Archives and Special Collections

 Media
 
 
 
 
 
 
 
 
 
  (several types of media formats are available)
  (several types of media formats are available)
Apollo-Soyuz Test Project (1973) Film, Texas Archive of the Moving Image

 
1975 in international relations
1975 in the Soviet Union
Crewed Soyuz missions
Soviet Union–United States relations
Spacecraft launched in 1975
Spacecraft which reentered in 1975
July 1975 events
Spacecraft launched by Soyuz-U rockets
Spacecraft launched by Saturn rockets
Alexei Leonov
Thomas P. Stafford
Deke Slayton